Robert Hutchison of Carlowrie FRSE (1834-25 February1894) was a Scottish landowner, landscape photographer and arboriculturalist. He was President of the Royal Scottish Arboricultural Society 1864 to 1871.

Life

Hutchison's mother was Jean (or Jane) Wylie (d.1889) and his father was Thomas Hutchison (1796-1852), Provost of Leith and a well-known wine merchant. He followed his father into the wine trade in Leith, and inherited the family business in 1852, at the age of 18, on his father’s death.

His father had commissioned the building of Carlowrie Castle, near Kirkliston, from the Edinburgh architect David Bryce. The project was inherited by Hutchinson, and completed in 1855.

In 1864 he was elected a Fellow of the Royal Society of Edinburgh, in recognition of his expertise in forestry, his proposer being William Stevenson. In 1866 he is listed as a member of the Edinburgh Botanical Society alongside Arthur Abney Walker.

In 1880 he was one of the five founders of Craiglockhart Church.

He died in Brodick on the Isle of Arran on 25 February 1894.

Family

In 1863 he married Mary Jemima Tait daughter of Reverend Adam Duncan Tait. They had eight children. These included Sir Thomas Hutchison (1866-1925), who became Lord Provost of Edinburgh, and Sir Robert Hutchison, 1st Baronet (1871-1960).

His niece was the female explorer and adventurer, Isobel Wylie Hutchison.

References

1834 births
1894 deaths
Scottish landowners
Scottish photographers
Fellows of the Royal Society of Edinburgh
19th-century Scottish businesspeople